What did you do in the war, Thanasis? is a 1971 Greek satirical drama film. It starred Thanasis Veggos as Thanasis, a poor labourer trying to survive during the Axis occupation of Greece. With references to the Great Famine (Greece) and the Greek resistance, the film was also a political allegory for the Greek military junta of 1967–1974. It won the Best Film Award at the Thessaloniki International Film Festival.

Cast

Thanasis Veggos ..... Thanasis Karathanasis
Katerina Gogou ..... Froso Karathanasi
Antonis Papadopoulos ..... Hans
Efi Roditi ..... Danae
Nikitas Platis ..... Thodoros
Mihalis Giannatos ..... Italian officer
Stelios Lionakis ..... Ivan
Kaiti Lambropoulou ..... Cleopatra
Giannis Firios ..... judge
Dinos Doulgerakis ..... lawyer
Kostas Stavrinoudakis ..... electric company worker

External links

1971 films
1971 comedy-drama films
1970s satirical films
Greek comedy-drama films
1970s Greek-language films
Films about famine
Films set in Axis-occupied Greece
Greek satirical films
Greek black-and-white films
Films shot in Greece
Anti-war films about World War II
1970s war comedy-drama films
1971 comedy films
1971 drama films
Greek World War II films